Adam Jerzy Bielan (born on 12 September 1974 in  Gdańsk, Poland) is a Polish politician, Member of the European Parliament for Lesser Poland and Świętokrzyskie.

Bielan sits on the European Parliament's Committee on Regional Development.  Bielan is a substitute for the Committee on Transport and Tourism, a member of the Delegation for relations with Mercosur and a substitute for the Delegation to the ACP-EU Joint Parliamentary Assembly.

Biography
Bielan was chairman of the Independent Students' Union from 1996 to 1998.  In September 1997, he was elected to the Sejm for Solidarity Electoral Action on the national list: 9 days after his 23rd birthday.  The following year, he joined the Conservative People's Party.  In 1999, he became vice-chairman of the European Democrat Students, in which capacity he served for one year.

He joined the Right Alliance (PP) when it was formed in 2001, and ran successfully on the Law and Justice (PiS) list at that year's election in Chrzanów.  He joined Law and Justice when the PP merged into it in 2002.  He was appointed to the European Parliament on Poland's accession on 1 May 2004 and was re-elected at the election in June 2004, representing Lesser Poland and Świętokrzyskie, which includes Chrzanów.

Together with fellow MEP Michał Kamiński, Bielan was behind Lech Kaczyński's successful campaign in the 2005 presidential election.  In 2007, Bielan was elected a Vice President of the European Parliament, as the representative of Union for Europe of the Nations, to which PiS belonged.

Bielan was re-elected to the European Parliament at the 2009 election, and joined the European Conservatives and Reformists group with PiS.  He was elected one of the ECR's two Vice-Chairmen, with Michał Kamiński as chairman.  Along with Kamiński and two other MEPs, Bielan became associated with the Poland Comes First party in November 2010.  They continued to sit with the ECR in the Parliament and Bielan continued to be group Vice-Chairman. Bielan left Poland Comes First on 18 March 2011 to sit as an independent. He joined the newly found Poland Together party in January, 2014. He was excluded from the party in 2021.

Footnotes

External links
 
 
 

MEPs for Poland 2009–2014
MEPs for Poland 2004–2009
MEPs for Poland 2004
Law and Justice MEPs
Poland Comes First politicians
Polish Roman Catholics
1974 births
Living people
Politicians from Gdańsk
Poland Together MEPs
MEPs for Poland 2019–2024